The discography of American rapper Snoop Dogg includes 19 studio albums, five collaborative albums, 17 compilation albums, three extended plays, 25 mixtapes, 175 singles (including 112 as a featured artist), and 16 promotional singles. He has sold over 12.5 million albums in the United States and 37 million albums worldwide. He has garnered 14 top ten singles on the Billboard Hot 100 (including eight as a featured artist).

His debut album, Doggystyle, was released in 1993, debuting atop the U.S. Billboard 200 chart. In 1994, he released a soundtrack for the short film Murder Was The Case, starring himself. It debuted at number one on the U.S. Billboard 200 chart. His second studio album Tha Doggfather, released in 1996, also debuted at number one on the U.S. Billboard 200 chart.

In 1998, Snoop released Da Game Is to Be Sold, Not to Be Told. His fourth studio album, No Limit Top Dogg, was released on May 11, 1999. The album debuted at number 2 on the US Billboard 200, becoming his first album not to top the chart.

He released three other albums throughout the early-2000s, including Tha Last Meal in 2000, Paid tha Cost to Be da Boss in 2002, and R&G (Rhythm & Gangsta): The Masterpiece in 2004, which included the single "Drop It Like It's Hot" featuring Pharrell. The song was nominated at the Grammy Awards for Best Rap Song and Best Rap Performance by a Duo or Group. It topped the US Billboard Hot 100, becoming Snoop's first US number one single.

In 2006, the song "I Wanna Love You", a collaboration with Akon, became Snoop's second number one on the Hot 100. Tha Blue Carpet Treatment Snoop's eighth studio album, was also released in 2006. His ninth studio album, Ego Trippin' was released by Geffen Records on March 11, 2008. His tenth studio album Malice n Wonderland was released in December 2009.

He released two albums in 2011: Doggumentary and a soundtrack album titled Mac & Devin Go to High School with Wiz Khalifa, which included the hit song "Young, Wild & Free" featuring Bruno Mars.

In 2012, he changed his stage name to "Snoop Lion". Under the moniker, he released one project, a reggae album titled Reincarnated. The album topped Billboard Top Reggae Albums for 34 non-consecutive weeks.

He went on to release six more albums, reverting to his previous stage name: Bush in 2015. Coolaid in 2016, Neva Left in 2017, a gospel album, Bible of Love in 2018, I Wanna Thank Me in 2019, and his most recent album From tha Streets 2 tha Suites in 2021.

Albums

Studio albums

Reissues

Collaborative albums

Soundtrack albums

Compilation albums

Mixtapes

Video albums

Extended plays

Singles

As lead artist

1990s

2000s

2010s

2020s

As featured artist

1990s

2000s

2010s

2020s

Promotional singles

Other charted songs

Guest appearances

Production discography

See also 
 213 discography
 Tha Eastsidaz discography
 Snoop Dogg filmography

Notes

References

External links 
 The Music Video Production Association - Production guide PDF
 Discography at GEMM online store

Hip hop discographies
Snoop Dogg
Discographies of American artists